Milan Medić (born 16 March 1961) is a Serbian former basketball player who played for MZT from 1982 until 1995.

References

1961 births
Living people
Centers (basketball)
Serbian men's basketball players
Sportspeople from Sombor
Serbian expatriate basketball people in North Macedonia
KK MZT Skopje players
KK Partizan players